Cornelis Hofstede de Groot (9 November 1863 – 14 April 1930), was a Dutch art collector, art historian and museum curator.

Life
He was born in Dwingeloo and spent some time in Switzerland in his youth due to weak lungs, where he learned German. He became the first academically schooled art historian of the Netherlands, receiving his training in Leipzig, which is why much of his work was published in German, most notably his lengthy 10-part Beschreibendes kritisches Verzeichnis der Werke der hervorragendsten Holländischen Mahler des XVII. Jahrhunderts (1907–28), also known as a rewrite of John Smith's catalogue raisonné (9 vols.; 1829–42, London). He became an expert who had many differences of opinion with Abraham Bredius and other art collectors, while serving various institutions to do with the arts of the Netherlands, including the Frans Hals Museum, Gemeentemuseum Den Haag, and the RKD.

In 1893 he published a short article on Judith Leyster in the journal Jahrbuch der Königlich Preussischen Kunstsammlungen, thus "re-discovering" her work for the first time after centuries.
In 1896 he became director of the Rijksprentenkabinet in Amsterdam, but he quit after two years because of a difference of opinion with his predecessor there. He then settled in The Hague as an independent art critic and began work on an eight-part book on Rembrandt with Wilhelm von Bode. His catalog of his extensive collection of Rembrandt drawings in German was published by the Teylers Tweede Genootschap in their Verhandelingen of 1906. In 1910 he published a catalog of paintings by Frans Hals. From 1912 to 1930 he lived in Haarlem, where he was a member of Teylers Tweede Genootschap.
From 1916 onwards he was a member of the Rijksmonument commission in the Netherlands.
He wrote over 70 biographies of Dutch painters for the kunstenaarslexikon of Ulrich Thieme and Felix Becker.

Catalogue Raisonné

He began the painstaking work of updating John Smith's catalogue raisonné in 1907 in German, but took on the translator Edward G. Hawke almost immediately to ensure publication in English. Unfortunately, Hofstede de Groot died before the translation of all volumes could be completed. The publications were (German date, followed in parentheses by the English date):
 Band 1 1907 (Volume 1 1908) : Jan Steen, Gabriel Metsu, Gerard Dou, Pieter de Hooch, Carel Fabritius, Johannes Vermeer of Delft, produced with assistance by W.R. Valentiner
 Band 2 1908 (Volume 2 1909) : Aelbert Cuyp, Philips Wouwerman, produced with assistance by Kurt Freise
 Band 3 1910 (Volume 3 1910) : Frans Hals, Adriaen van Ostade, Isaac van Ostade, Adriaen Brouwer, produced with assistance by Kurt Freise, Kurt Erasmus
 Band 4 1911 (Volume 4 1912) : Jacob van Ruysdael, Meindert Hobbema, Adriaen van de Velde, Paulus Potter, produced with assistance by Kurt Erasmus, W.R. Valentiner, Kurt Freise
 Band 5 1912 (Volume 5 1913) : Gerard ter Borch, Caspar Netscher, Godfried Schalcken, Pieter van Slingeland, Eglon Hendrik van der Neer, produced with assistance by Eduard Plietzsch, 
 Band 6 1914 (Volume 6 1916) : Rembrandt, Nicolaes Maes, produced with assistance by Karl Lilienfeld, Heinrich Wichmann, Kurt Erasmus
 Band 7 1918 (Volume 7 1923) : Willem van de Velde, Johannes van de Capelle, Ludolf Bakhuyzen, Aert van der Neer, produced with assistance by Karl Lilienfeld, Otto Hirschmann
 Band 8 1923 (Volume 8 1927) : Jan van Goyen, Jan van der Heyden, Johannes Wijnants, produced with assistance by O. Hirschmann, H. Kaufmann, W. Stechow
 Band 9 1926 (German only) : Johannes Hackaert, Nicolaes Berchem, Karel du Jardin, Jan Both, Adam Pijnacker, produced with assistance by O. Hirschmann, W. Stechow, K. Bauch
 Band 10 1928 (German only) : Frans van Mieris, Willem van Mieris, Adriaen van der Werff, Rachel Ruysch, Jan van Huysum, produced with assistance by Elisabeth Neurdenburg, O. Hirschmann, K. Bauch

References

Cornelis Hofstede de Groot in the Dictionary of Art Historians

External links
 Books by Cornelis Hofstede de Groot on the Google Books Library Project
 Overview of publications by Cornelis Hofstede de Groot
 A Catalogue Raisonne of the Works of the Most Eminent Dutch Painters of the Seventeenth Century, based on the work of John Smith, by Hofstede de Groot, Volume III, 1910, on archive.org

1863 births
1930 deaths
Dutch art historians
People from Drenthe
Members of Teylers Tweede Genootschap
Rembrandt scholars
People from Haarlem